The Logan House Hotel was a historic hotel located in Altoona, Pennsylvania. The hotel was in operation from the 1850s to the 1920s, when it was demolished.

History 
The Logan House Hotel was built between 1852-53 by Thomas Burchinell, a carpenter who worked for the Pennsylvania Railroad. The three-story, 106 room hotel was located close to Altoona's train station, which sat on an important rail line between Harrisburg and Pittsburgh. The hotel is recorded as having heated water and gas lighting. The hotel was named after Chief Logan, a local Native American chief whom had lived in the area in the 18th-century.

In 1862 the hotel was the site of the War Governors' Conference, a meeting in which several high-profile governors of United States states affirmed their support for the Union during the-then ongoing American Civil War. 

The Logan House Hotel was closed in 1927, and in 1931 the property was sold to the United States Government, which built a post office on the site of the former hotel.

References 

 

Hotels in Pennsylvania
Hotel buildings completed in 1853
1853 establishments in Pennsylvania
Buildings and structures in Altoona, Pennsylvania